This is a list of defunct airlines of Anguilla.

See also
 List of airlines of Anguilla
 List of airports in Anguilla

References

Defunct airlines of Anguilla
Anguilla
Airlines